Stephen A. Orthwein (October 28, 1945 – March 11, 2018)  was an American heir and polo player.

Early life
He is a great-great-grandson of Adolphus Busch, founder of the Anheuser-Busch Brewing Company. He has a twin brother, Peter Busch Orthwein, the chairman and CEO of Thor Industries. He attended the Culver Academies in 1960. He graduated from Yale University, where he led the team to the National Collegiate Polo Championships in 1967 and 1968.

Polo
A six-goal handicap in polo, he won the Monty Waterbury Cup in 1977, the Butler Handicap in 1979, and the 16-Goal championship in 1967.

He served as secretary of the United States Polo Association (USPA) from 1984 to 1988, president from 1988 to 1991, and chairman from 1991 to 1995. He received the association's Hugo Dalmar Award in 1988. In 2007, he was inducted into the Culver Academies' Horsemanship Hall of Fame.

He served as chairman of the Museum of Polo and Hall of Fame in Lake Worth, Florida, from 2001 to 2010, and was inducted on February 18, 2011. He served on the board of Directors of the Polo Training Foundation.

Death
Orthwein died on March 11, 2018, at his home in Wellington, Florida.

Bibliography
The Polo Encyclopedia (with Horace A. Laffaye, McFarland & Co, 2003)

References

1945 births
2018 deaths
Yale University alumni
American polo players
American people of German descent
Busch family
Culver Academies alumni
Orthwein business family